Tristan da Cunha, colloquially Tristan, is a remote group of volcanic islands in the South Atlantic Ocean.

, the main island has 250 permanent inhabitants, who all carry British Overseas Territories citizenship. The other islands are uninhabited, except for the South African personnel of a weather station on Gough Island.

Tristan da Cunha is a British Overseas Territory with its own constitution. There is no airstrip on the main island; the only way of travelling in and out of Tristan is by boat, a six-day trip from South Africa.

History

Discovery

The uninhabited islands were first recorded as sighted in 1506 by Portuguese explorer Tristão da Cunha, though rough seas prevented a landing. He named the main island after himself, Ilha de Tristão da Cunha. It was later anglicised from its earliest mention on British Admiralty charts to Tristan da Cunha Island. Some sources state that the Portuguese made the first landing in 1520, when the Lás Rafael captained by Ruy Vaz Pereira called at Tristan for water.

The first undisputed landing was made on 7 February 1643 by the crew of the Dutch East India Company ship Heemstede, captained by Claes Gerritsz Bierenbroodspot. The Dutch stopped at the island four more times in the next 25 years, and in 1656 created the first rough charts of the archipelago.

The first full survey of the archipelago was made by crew of the French corvette Heure du Berger in 1767. The first scientific exploration was conducted by French naturalist Louis-Marie Aubert du Petit-Thouars, who stayed on the island for three days in January 1793, during a French mercantile expedition from Brest, France to Mauritius. Thouars made botanical collections and reported traces of human habitation, including fireplaces and overgrown gardens, probably left by Dutch explorers in the 17th century.

On his voyage out from Europe to East Africa and India in command of the Imperial Asiatic Company of Trieste and Antwerp ship, Joseph et Therese, William Bolts sighted Tristan da Cunha, put a landing party ashore on 2 February 1777 and hoisted the Imperial flag, naming it and its neighboring islets the Isles de Brabant. However, no settlement or facilities were ever set up there by the company.

After the outbreak of the American Revolutionary War halted penal transportation to the Thirteen Colonies, British prisons started to overcrowd. As several stopgap measures proved to be ineffective, the British Government announced in December 1785 that it would proceed with the settlement of New South Wales. In September 1786 Alexander Dalrymple, presumably goaded by Bolts's actions, published a pamphlet with an alternative proposal of his own for settlements on Tristan da Cunha, St. Paul and Amsterdam islands in the Southern Ocean.

Captain John Blankett, R.N., also suggested independently to his superiors in August 1786 that convicts be used to establish a British settlement on Tristan. In consequence, the Admiralty received orders from the government in October 1789 to examine the island as part of a general survey of the South Atlantic and the coasts of southern Africa. That did not happen, but an investigation of Tristan, Amsterdam and St. Paul was undertaken in December 1792 and January 1793 by George Macartney, Britain's first ambassador to China. During his voyage to China, he established that none of the islands were suitable for settlement.

19th century
The first permanent settler was Jonathan Lambert of Salem, Massachusetts, United States, who moved to the island in December 1810 with two other men, to be joined later by a fourth. Lambert publicly declared the islands his property and named them the Islands of Refreshment. Three of the four men died in 1812 and Thomas Currie (Tommaso Corri, from Livorno, Italy), one of the original three, remained as a farmer on the island.

On 14 August 1816, the United Kingdom annexed the islands by sending a garrison to secure possession, and making them a dependency of the Cape Colony in South Africa. This was explained as a measure to prevent the islands' use as a base for any attempt to free Napoleon Bonaparte from his prison on Saint Helena. The occupation also prevented the United States from using Tristan da Cunha as a base for naval cruisers, as it had during the War of 1812. The garrison left the islands in November 1817, although some members of the garrison, notably William Glass, stayed and formed the nucleus of a permanent population.

The islands were occupied by a garrison of British Marines, and a civilian population gradually grew.  stopped there on 25 March 1824 and reported that it had a population of twenty-two men and three women. The barque South Australia stayed there on 18–20 February 1836 when a certain Glass was Governor, as reported in a chapter on the island by W. H. Leigh.

Whalers set up bases on the islands for operations in the Southern Atlantic. However, the opening of the Suez Canal in 1869, together with the gradual transition from sailing ships to coal-fired steam ships, increased the isolation of the islands, which were no longer needed as a stopping port for lengthy sail voyages, or for shelter for journeys from Europe to East Asia. A parson arrived in February 1851, the Bishop of Cape Town visited in March 1856 and the island was included within the diocese of Cape Town.

In 1836 the schooner Emily ran aground with the Dutch fisherman Pieter Groen from Katwijk. He stayed, married there, changed his name to Peter Green and in 1865 became spokesman/governor of the community. In 1856 there were already 97 people living there. 

In 1867, Prince Alfred, Duke of Edinburgh and second son of Queen Victoria, visited the islands. The only settlement, Edinburgh of the Seven Seas, was named in honour of his visit. On 15 October 1873, the Royal Navy scientific survey vessel HMS Challenger docked at Tristan to conduct geographic and zoological surveys on Tristan, Inaccessible Island and the Nightingale Islands. In his log, Captain George Nares recorded a total of fifteen families and eighty-six individuals living on the island. Tristan became a dependency of the British Crown in October 1875.

On 27 November 1885, the island suffered one of its worst tragedies after an iron barque named West Riding approached the island, whilst en route to Sydney, Australia from Bristol. Due to the loss of regular trading opportunities, almost all of the island's able-bodied men approached the ship in a lifeboat attempting to trade with the passing vessel. The boat, recently donated by the British government, sailed despite rough waters and, although the lifeboat was spotted sailing alongside the ship for some time, it never returned. Various reports were given following the event, with rumours ranging from the men drowning, to reports of them being taken to Australia and sold as slaves. In total, 15 men were lost, leaving behind an island of widows. A plaque at St. Mary's Church commemorates the lost men.

20th century

Hard winter of 1906
After years of hardship since the 1880s and an especially difficult winter in 1906, the British government offered to evacuate the island in 1907. The Tristanians held a meeting and decided to refuse, despite the government's warning that it could not promise further help in the future.

Occasional pre-war visits
No ships called at the islands from 1909 until 1919, when HMS Yarmouth stopped to inform the islanders of the outcome of World War I.

The Shackleton–Rowett Expedition stopped in Tristan for five days in May 1922, collecting geological and botanical samples before returning to Cape Town. Among the few ships that visited in the coming years were the RMS Asturias, a Royal Mail Steam Packet Company passenger liner, in 1927, and the ocean liners RMS Empress of France in 1928,  in 1929, and RMS Empress of Australia in 1935. 

In 1936, The Daily Telegraph of London reported that the population of the island was 167 people, with 185 cattle and 42 horses.

From December 1937 to March 1938, a Norwegian party made a dedicated scientific expedition to Tristan da Cunha, and sociologist Peter A. Munch extensively documented island culture; he visited the island again in 1964–1965. The island was also visited in 1938 by W. Robert Foran, reporting for the National Geographic Society. His account was published that same year.

On 12 January 1938 by letters patent, Britain declared the islands a dependency of Saint Helena, creating the British Crown Colony of Saint Helena and Dependencies, which also included Ascension Island.

WW-II military development
During the Second World War, Tristan was commissioned by the Royal Navy as the so-called "stone frigate"  and used as a secret signals intelligence station, to monitor German U-boats (which were required to maintain radio contact) and shipping in the South Atlantic Ocean. The weather and radio stations led to extensive new infrastructure being built on the island, including a school, a hospital, and a cash-based general store.

The first colonial official sent to rule the island was Sir Hugh Elliott in the rank of Administrator (because the settlement was too small to merit a Governor) 1950–1953. Development continued as the island's first canning factory expanded paid employment in 1949.

Rare post-war ship visits
Prince Philip, Duke of Edinburgh, the Queen's consort, visited the islands in 1957 as part of a world tour on board the royal yacht HMY Britannia.

On 2 January 1954, Tristan da Cunha was visited by the Dutch ship Ruys, a passenger-cargo liner, carrying science fiction writer Robert A. Heinlein, his wife Ginny and other passengers. The Ruys was travelling from Rio de Janeiro, Brazil, to Cape Town, South Africa. The visit is described in Heinlein's book "Tramp Royale". The captain told Heinlein the island was the most isolated inhabited spot on Earth and ships rarely visited. Heinlein mailed a letter there to L. Ron Hubbard, a friend who also liked to travel, "for the curiosity value of the postmark". Biographer William H. Patterson, Jr. in his two volume "Robert A. Heinlein In Dialogue with his Century," wrote that lack of "cultural context" made it "nearly impossible to converse" with the islanders, "a stark contrast with the way they had managed to chat with strangers" while travelling in South America. Members of the crew bought penguins during their brief visit to the island.

1961 eruption of Queen Mary's Peak
On 10 October 1961, the eruption of a parasitic cone of Queen Mary's Peak, very close to Edinburgh of the Seven Seas, forced evacuation of all 264 people. The evacuees took to the water in open boats, taken by the local lobster-fishing boats Tristania and Frances Repetto to uninhabited Nightingale Island.

The next day, they were picked up by the diverted Dutch passenger ship Tjisadane that took them to Cape Town. The islanders later arrived in the U.K. aboard the liner M.V. Stirling Castle to a big press reception and, after a short period at Pendell Army Camp in Merstham, Surrey, were settled in an old Royal Air Force camp near Calshot, Hampshire.

The following year, a Royal Society expedition reported that Edinburgh of the Seven Seas had survived. Most families returned in 1963.

Gough and Inaccessible Islands wildlife reserves

Gough Island was inscribed as a UNESCO World Heritage Site in 1995 as Gough Island Wildlife Reserve. This was further extended in 2004 as Gough and Inaccessible Islands, with its marine zone extended from 3 to 12 nautical miles.

These islands have been Ramsar sites – wetlands of international importance – since 20 November 2008.

21st century

A number of structures were severely damaged, and numerous cattle were killed, prompting emergency aid provided by the British government.
In 2005, the islands were given a United Kingdom post code (TDCU 1ZZ), to make it easier for the residents to order goods online.

On 13 February 2008, a fire destroyed the island's four power generators and fish canning factory, severely disrupting the economy. On 14 March 2008, new generators were installed and power restored, and a new factory opened in July 2009. While the replacement factory was built, M/V Kelso came to the island as a factory ship. The St. Helena, Ascension, and Tristan da Cunha Constitution Order 2009 reorganized Tristan da Cunha as a constituent of the new British Overseas Territory of Saint Helena, Ascension and Tristan da Cunha, giving Tristan and Ascension equal status with Saint Helena.

On 16 March 2011, the freighter  ran aground on Nightingale Island, spilling tons of heavy fuel oil into the ocean. The resulting oil slick threatened the island's population of rockhopper penguins. Nightingale Island has no fresh water, so the penguins were transported to Tristan da Cunha for cleaning.

The move will make the zone the largest no-take zone in the Atlantic and the fourth largest on the planet. The move follows 20 years of conservation work by the RSPB and the island government and five years of the UK government's Blue Belt program support.

A total solar eclipse will pass over the island on 5 December 2048. The island is calculated to be on the centre line of the umbra's path for nearly three and a half minutes of totality.

Geography

Tristan da Cunha is thought to have been formed by a long-lived centre of upwelling mantle called the Tristan hotspot. Tristan da Cunha is the main island of the Tristan da Cunha archipelago, which consists of the following islands:

 Tristan da Cunha, the main and largest island, area: 
 Inaccessible Island, area: 
 Nightingale Islands, area: 
 Nightingale Island, area: 
 Middle Island, area: 
 Stoltenhoff Island, area: 
 Gough Island (Diego Alvarez), area: 

Inaccessible Island and the Nightingale Islands are  SW by W and SSW away from the main island, respectively, whereas Gough Island is  SSE.

The main island is generally mountainous. The only flat area is on the north-west coast, which is the location of the only settlement, Edinburgh of the Seven Seas, and the agricultural area of Potato Patches. The other islands of the group are uninhabited, except for a weather station with a staff of six on Gough Island, which has been operated by South Africa since 1956 and has been at its present location at Transvaal Bay on the southeast coast since 1963.

Climate
The archipelago has a Cfb, wet oceanic climate, under the Köppen system, with mild temperatures and very limited sunshine but consistent moderate-to-heavy rainfall due to the persistent westerly winds. Under the Trewartha classification, Tristan da Cunha has a humid subtropical climate due to the lack of cold weather. The number of rainy days is comparable to the Aleutian Islands at a much higher latitude in the northern hemisphere, while sunshine hours are comparable to Juneau, Alaska, 20° farther from the equator. Sandy Point on the east coast is reputed to be the warmest and driest place on the island, being in the lee of the prevailing winds.

Flora and fauna

Many of the flora and fauna of the archipelago have a broad circumpolar distribution in the South Atlantic and South Pacific Oceans. For example, the plant species Nertera granadensis was first collected in Tristan da Cunha, but has since been recorded as far away as New Zealand.

Invasive species 
The islands of Tristan da Cunha have a high significance of global biodiversity: two of them, Gough and Inaccessible, form a UNESCO natural World Heritage Site. This designation is largely due to the seabird population found there. The biodiversity of the island is vulnerable to introduction of invasive species. Due to Tristan da Cunha's isolated archipelago ecology, and increase of tourism with cruise ships and research vessels, invasive species are a particular concern for Tristan da Cunha. The islands' vegetation and mammal species are not equipped to defend against or control introduced species, increasing island vulnerability, due to lack of defensive behavioural mechanisms and slow generational output rates. Efforts to decrease and eradicate invasive flora, fauna, and marine species have been undertaken, including a programme aimed at eradicating predatory invasive mice on Gough Island. The following described invasive species have been known to have harmful effects on the islands' vegetation and native species.

Invasive house mice on these islands have adapted to be 50% larger than average house mice. They are thought to have been accidentally introduced by 19th century seal hunters who would dock on the islands. These mice have adapted by consuming sea bird eggs and chicks (as they nest on the ground). Gathering at night in groups of 9 or 10, the mice gather at the bird's nest to feast. With no natural predators, the invasive mice population is able to expand by producing new generations twice a year.

In order to prevent the growth of the invasive mice population and extinction of the Albatross bird species, a 2019 Gough Island mouse eradication project was announced (Grundy, 2018). The RSPB and Tristan da Cunha Government have partnered to spread cereal pellets with rodenticide bait across Gough Island, in hopes to eradicate the invasive mice population. The goal of this operation is to restore Tristan da Cunha back to its natural state, ensuring it will still be one of the world's most important seabird nesting sites.

Flora

Native plants 

A combination of the list on Kew's Plants of the World Online site with information from a paper by Wace and Holdgate yields the following list (by no means exhaustive) of plant species recorded as native to Tristan da Cunha.

Eudicots
 Apium australe Thouars (Apiaceae)
 Atriplex plebeia Carmich. (Amaranthaceae)
 Callitriche christensenii Christoph. (Plantaginaceae)
 Chevreulia sarmentosa (Pers.) S.F.Blake (Asteraceae)
 Cotula goughensis Rud. Brown (Asteraceae)
 Cotula moseleyi Hemsl. (Asteraceae)
 Dysphania tomentosa (Thouars) Mosyakin & Clemants (Amaranthaceae)
 Empetrum rubrum Vahl ex Willd. (Ericaceae)
 Gamochaeta thouarsii (Spreng.) Anderb. (Asteraceae)
 Gnaphalium thouarsii Spreng. (Asteraceae)
 Hydrocotyle capitata Thouars (Araliaceae)
 Nertera granadensis Druce (Rubiaceae)
 Pelargonium cucullatum (L.) L'Hér. (Geraniaceae)
 Pelargonium grossularioides (L.) L'Hér. (Geraniaceae)
 Phylica arborea Thouars (Rhamnaceae)
 Rumex frutescens Thouars (Polygonaceae)
 Sophora macnabiana (Graham) Skottsb. (Fabaceae)

Commelinids
 Agrostis carmichaelii Schult. & Schult.f. (Poaceae)
 Agrostis crinum-ursi Mez (Poaceae)
 Agrostis media Carmich. (Poaceae)
 Agrostis trachychlaena C.E. Hubbard (Poaceae)
 Carex insularis Carmich. (Cyperaceae)
 Carex thouarsii Carmich. (Cyperaceae)
 Deschampsia wacei C.E.Hubb. (Poaceae)
 Isolepis bicolor Carmich. (Cyperaceae)
 Isolepis moseleyana (Boeckeler) Muasya (Cyperaceae)
 Isolepis prolifera (Rottb.) R.Br. (Cyperaceae)
 Isolepis sulcata (Thouars) Carmich. (Cyperaceae)
 Sporobolus mobberleyanus P.M.Peterson & Saarela (Poaceae)
 Rostkovia tristanensis Christoph. (Juncaceae)

Ferns, Mosses and Clubmosses
 Asplenium aequibasis (C.Chr.) J.P.Roux (Aspleniaceae)
 Asplenium alvarezense Rudm. Brown (Aspleniaceae)
 Athyrium medium (Carmich.) T.Moore (Athyriaceae)
 Austroblechnum penna-marina (Poir.) Gasper & V.A.O.Dittrich (Blechnaceae)
 Elaphoglossum laurifolium (Thouars) T.Moore (Dryopteridaceae)
 Lomariocycas palmiformis (Thouars) C.Chr. (Blechnaceae)
 Lycopodium diaphanum (P.Beauv.) Sw. (Lycopodiaceae)
 Notogrammitis billardierei (Willdenow) Parris (Polypodiaceae)
 Polyphlebium angustatum (Carmich.) Ebihara & Dubuisson (Hymenophyllaceae)
 Racomitrium lanuginosum (Hedw.) Brid. (Grimmiaceae)
 Rumohra adiantiformis (G.Forst.) Ching (Dryopteridaceae)

Introduced plants

Tristan da Cunha acquired an estimated 137 non-native vascular plants that can be categorized into four species types; weeds (trees, shrubs, agricultural weeds), grassland species (grasses), garden escapes (vegetables), and other ruderal species. Vascular plants were accidentally introduced in a variety of ways including; impurities in flower or vegetable seeds, seeds or plant fragments from other imported plants and in soil, attached to containers, cars or people. The majority of invasive weed species that has been introduced to the island are spread by seed and cover 50% of arable land in widely distributed patches. These species include prickly sow-thistle (Sonchus asper), smooth sow-thistle (Sonchus oleraceus), smooth hawksbeard (Crepis capillaris), scrambling fumitory (Fumaria muralis), green field speedwell (Veronica agrestis), groundsel (Senecio vulgaris), and nutgrass (Cyperus esculentus). Other invasive weed species that have a more localized distribution in plots include prickly sow-thistle (Sonchus asper), smooth sow-thistle (Sonchus oleraceus), smooth hawksbeard (Crepis capillaris), and groundsel (Senecio vulgaris). Whether a species is distributed locally or widely depends on the seed's dispersal mechanisms; larger seeds that have not adapted to wind dispersal will be distributed locally, while smaller seeds have adapted to wind dispersal will be widely distributed.

The invasive plants have had several negative impacts on native island plant species, including the competitive exclusion of many such species. The out-competition will and can alter the structure of plant communities and the quality of the islands' soil. Introduced vegetation has altered long-term carbon storage as well as the reduction of CO2 in the atmosphere. Native plants such as fern bushes, Phylica bushes, fern brakes, mires, and bogs, contain high organic content matter which functions as storage for carbon. With the introduction of harmful species, the islands will see a decrease in carbon storage of both the soil and vegetation. With multiple changes occurring within the soil due to invasive plant species, the nutrient cycle is bound to be negatively influenced. Invasive plants are also affecting the human population of Tristan da Cunha by being disease carriers and becoming agricultural pests in gardens and pastures.

The alien plants are able to survive and continue to grow and spread successfully on the islands because they have the ability to naturalize in temperate regions and have limited necessities needed to survive. The islands' isolation increases archipelago ecology uniqueness which increases susceptibility for foreign invaders. A small human population with minimal development encourages flora and fauna development within a limited food web which increases the invasive species abilities for self-defense.

Plants are being controlled by taking surveys of the invasive species, evaluating their impact on biodiversity, and evaluating the feasibility of their eradication. It would be nearly impossible to try and eradicate all invasive plant species so scientists are narrowing down to control particular species based on their impact and feasibility to eradicate. Mitigation plans that are taking place on Tristan are time-consuming and labor-intensive that will take several years using mechanical and chemical procedures.

Fauna

Land

Tristan is primarily known for its wildlife. The island has been identified as an Important Bird Area by BirdLife International because there are 13 known species of breeding seabirds on the island and two species of resident land birds. The seabirds include northern rockhopper penguins, Atlantic yellow-nosed albatrosses, sooty albatrosses, Atlantic petrels, great-winged petrels, soft-plumaged petrels, broad-billed prions, grey petrels, great shearwaters, sooty shearwaters, Tristan skuas, Antarctic terns and brown noddies. Tristan and Gough Islands are the only known breeding sites in the world for the Atlantic petrel. Inaccessible Island is also the only known breeding ground of the spectacled petrel. The Tristan albatross is known to breed only on Gough and Inaccessible Islands: all nest on Gough, except for one or two pairs which nest on Inaccessible Island.

The endemic Tristan thrush, also known as the "starchy", occurs on all of the northern islands and each has its own subspecies, with Tristan birds being slightly smaller and duller than those on Nightingale and Inaccessible. The endemic Inaccessible Island rail, the smallest extant flightless bird in the world, is found only on Inaccessible Island. In 1956, eight Gough moorhens were released at Sandy Point on Tristan, and have subsequently colonised the island.

Marine

The Marine Protected Area bans mining and fishing (except the local lobster fishery), with enforcement the responsibility of the UK government via satellite surveillance. According to the Royal Society for the Protection of Birds (RSPB), the islands and surrounding ocean is one of the most pristine temperate ecosystems on the planet.

Various species of whales and dolphins can be seen around Tristan from time to time with increasing sighting rates, although recovery of baleen whales, especially the southern right whale, were severely hindered by illegal whaling by the Soviet Union in the aftermath of the 1960 volcanic eruption. The subantarctic fur seal (Arctophoca tropicalis) can also be found in the Tristan archipelago, mostly on Gough Island.

The biodiversity of marine life is limited given the islands' isolation, making identifying the impacts of invasion difficult. While much of the marine life is unknown there has been an invasive species identified in the waters around the islands. This species is the South American silver porgy (Diplodus argenteus argenteus) which is thought to have sought refuge in the area due to the wreck of an oil platform off the coast of Tristan in 2006. The silver porgy is omnivorous but is not linked to the consumption of the valued lobster populations that the islanders fish. The silver porgy is however suspected to be consuming components of the islands’ fragile kelp forest. The giant kelp forests of Macrocystis pyrifera were extremely limited in biodiversity and has a simple, short-chain food web. While this species is considered non-native and invasive, removal efforts are currently not prioritized. Continued monitoring is suggested and expedition research for all invasive marine species are ongoing.

Economy
The island has a unique social and economic structure in which all resident families farm and all land is communally owned. Outsiders are prohibited from buying land or settling on Tristan. Besides subsistence agriculture, major industries are commercial fishing and government. Major export industries are the Tristan rock lobster (Jasus) fishery, the sale of the island's postage stamps and coins, and limited tourism. Like most British Overseas Territories, it was never a part of the European Union, but was a member of the EU's Overseas Countries and Territories Association.

The Bank of Saint Helena was established on Saint Helena and Ascension Island in 2004. This bank does not have a physical presence on Tristan da Cunha, but residents of Tristan are entitled to its services. Although Tristan da Cunha is part of the same overseas territory as Saint Helena, it does not use the local Saint Helena pound; sterling is used directly instead.

The island is located in the South Atlantic Anomaly, an area of the Earth with an abnormally weak magnetic field. On 14 November 2008 a geomagnetic observatory was inaugurated on the island as part of a joint venture between the Danish Meteorological Institute and DTU Space.

Transport

The remote location of the islands makes transport to the outside world difficult. Tristan da Cunha has no airstrip and is not generally accessible to air travel, though the wider territory is served by Saint Helena Airport and RAF Ascension Island. Fishing boats from South Africa service the islands eight or nine times per year.

The RMS Saint Helena used to connect the main island to St Helena and South Africa once each year during its January voyage, but has done so only a few times in the last years, in 2006, in 2011, and most recently in 2018. In the same year the RMS St. Helena was withdrawn from service. Three ships regularly service Tristan da Cunha, with typically fewer than a dozen visits a year. Other vessels may occasionally visit the island. The harbour at Edinburgh of the Seven Seas is called Calshot Harbour, named after the place in Hampshire, England where the islanders temporarily stayed during the volcanic eruption.

Tourism 
Unlike Saint Helena with its airport, hotels and restaurants, due to its remoteness Tristan da Cunha has a very small tourism industry. Tourists are welcome and the hospitality of the population is famous, but as it can only be reached by South African fishing trips in rough seas with limited vacancies, a trip must be planned months in advance, and only after a mandatory visit request is approved by the Island Council. 

Occasional boats or cruises may include a short visit to the island in their itinerary; but as there is no deep harbour, setting ashore is highly dependent on the maritime conditions. With all these limitations and in spite of the spectacular natural landscapes, visiting the territory is an attractive challenge for more adventurous travellers who can afford the time and money to get there. All visitors staying on Tristan must have a confirmed and fully paid return ticket, health insurance to include cover in case of medical evacuation to Cape Town, and sufficient funds to cover their entire stay. There are no hotels on the island. A visitor can rent a guest house (catered or self-catering) or stay in a private home on a full-board basis. There is a Tourism Post Office that sells souvenirs that might take months to arrive if ordered online.

Communications

Telecommunication 

The ITU has assigned telephone country code +290 for Tristan da Cunha; however, residents have access to the Foreign and Commonwealth Office Telecommunications Network, provided by Global Crossing. This service uses a London 020 numbering range, meaning that numbers are accessed via the UK telephone numbering plan. Satellite-delivered internet access arrived in Tristan da Cunha in 1998, but its high cost initially made it almost unaffordable for the local population, who primarily used it only to send email. The connection was also extremely unreliable, connecting through a 64 kbit/s satellite phone connection provided by Inmarsat.

Since 2006, a very-small-aperture terminal has provided bandwidth for government purposes that is also made available via an internet café and (after office hours) via Wi-Fi to island homes. As of 2016, there is not yet any mobile telephone coverage on the islands.

The Government and Tristan da Cunha Association jointly run the island official website with all practical information, news and facts about the island. While the site is updated from mainland UK, due to slow internet the photos taken and uploaded from Tristan da Cunha are all in low resolution, which allows online navigation in the territory with acceptable speed. 

Amateur radio
Amateur radio operator groups sometimes conduct DX-peditions on the island. One group operated as station ZD9ZS in September–October 2014. Nigel (G3TXF) was part of this DX-pedition.

Government

There are no political parties or trade unions on Tristan. Executive authority is vested in the King, who is represented in the territory by the Governor of Saint Helena. As the Governor resides permanently in Saint Helena, an Administrator is appointed to represent the Governor in the islands. The Administrator is a career civil servant in the Foreign Office, selected by London, who acts as the local head of government and takes advice from the Tristan da Cunha Island Council. Since 1998, each Administrator has usually served a three-year term (which begins in September, upon arrival of the supply ship from Cape Town). Fiona Kilpatrick and Stephen Townsend were exceptions to this rule, having taken up their job-share office in January 2020.

The Administrator and Island Council work from the Government Building, which is the only two-storey building on the island. The building is sometimes referred to as "Whitehall" or the "H'admin Building" and contains the Administrator's Office, Treasury Department, Administration Offices, and the Council Chamber where Island Council meetings are held. Policing is undertaken by one full-time police inspector and three special constables. Tristan da Cunha has some legislation of its own, but the law of Saint Helena applies generally to the extent that it is not inconsistent with local law, insofar as it is suitable for local circumstances and subject to such modifications as local circumstances make necessary.

Chief Islander
The Island Council is made up of eight elected and three appointed members, who serve a three-year term which begins in February or March. A separate but simultaneous vote is held to select the Chief Islander, who is the community's political leader. James Glass was re-elected to the position in March 2022 to a record-breaking fifth term in the role.

Demographics

Tristan da Cunha recorded a population of 243 in the June 2021 census. The only settlement is Edinburgh of the Seven Seas (known locally as "The Settlement"). The current residents are thought to have descended from fifteen outside ancestors, eight male and seven female, who arrived on the island at various dates between 1816 and 1908. The men were European, and the women were mixed race. Now all of the population has mixed ancestry. In addition, a male contributor of eastern European / Russian descent arrived in the early 1900s. In 1963, when families returned after the evacuation due to the 1961 volcanic eruption, the 200 settlers included four Tristan da Cunha women who brought with them new English husbands.

The female descendants have been traced by genetic study to five female founders, believed to be mixed-race (African, Asian and European descent) and from Saint Helena. The historical data recounted that there were two pairs of sisters, but the mtDNA evidence showed only one pair of sisters.

The early male founders originated from Scotland, England, the Netherlands, the United States, and Italy, who belonged to three Y-haplogroups: I (M170), R-SRY10831.2, and R (M207) (xSRY10831.2). The male founders shared nine surnames: Collins, Glass, Green, Hagan, Lavarello, Repetto, Rogers, Squibb, and Swain. In addition, a new haplotype was found that is associated with men of eastern Europe and Russia. It entered the population in the early 1900s, at a time when the island was visited by Russian sailing ships. There is "evidence for the contribution of a hidden ancestor who left his genes, but not his name, on the island." Another four instances of non-paternity were found among male descendants, but researchers believed their fathers were probably among the early island population.

There are eighty families on the island.

Language
Tristan da Cunha's isolation has led to development of its own accent. In popular writing, it has been described by the writer Simon Winchester as "a sonorous amalgam of Home Counties lockjaw and 19th century idiom, Afrikaans slang and Italian." 

Education

Children leave school at age 16, and although they can take GCSEs a year later, few do. The school on the island is St. Mary's School, which serves children from ages 4 to 16. The Naval Station had established a school building during World War II. The current facility opened in 1975 and has five classrooms, a kitchen, a stage, a computer room, and a craft and science room. Tristan students doing post-16 education receive assistance from the Tristan da Cunha Association Education Trust Fund and typically do so in the United Kingdom and South Africa.

The Tristan Song Project was a collaboration between St. Mary's School and amateur composers in Britain, led by music teacher Tony Triggs. It began in 2010 and involved St. Mary's pupils writing poems and Triggs providing musical settings by himself and his pupils. A desktop publication entitled Rockhopper Penguins and Other Songs (2010) embraced most of the songs completed that year and funded a consignment of guitars to the school. In February 2013, the Tristan Post Office issued a set of four Song Project stamps featuring island musical instruments and lyrics from Song Project songs about Tristan's volcano and wildlife. In 2014, the project broadened its scope and continues as the International Song Project.

Religion
The only religion is Christianity, with the only denominations being Anglican and Roman Catholic. The Roman Catholic population is served by the Mission Sui Iuris of Saint Helena, Ascension, and Tristan da Cunha, which is administratively a part of the Apostolic Prefecture of the Falkland Islands. Edwin Dodgson, youngest brother of Lewis Carroll, spent several years as a missionary on the island in the nineteenth century.

Health
Healthcare is funded by the government, undertaken at most times by one resident doctor. Surgery or facilities for complex childbirth are therefore limited, and emergencies can necessitate communicating with passing fishing vessels so the injured person can be ferried to Cape Town.

As of late 2007, IBM and Beacon Equity Partners, co-operating with Medweb, the University of Pittsburgh Medical Center and the island's government on "Project Tristan", had supplied the island's doctor with access to long distance tele-medical help, making it possible to send EKG and X-ray pictures to doctors in other countries for instant consultation.

The Camogli Healthcare Centre, usually referred to as the hospital, was built and equipped in 2016/2017 to the latest UK National Health Service standards and was officially opened on 7 June 2017. It is located in the southwestern corner of the settlement below the previous hospital (built in 1971), which is now used by the veterinarians and for general storage. The new hospital was funded by the UK Department for International Development with the intention the improved facilities would allow more procedures to be performed locally by visiting specialists, and therefore reduce the need for expensive referrals to Cape Town.

There are normally two expatriate doctors on the island, who provide 24 hour cover. There are also normally two expatriate and four local nurses, as well as two dental technicians, a hospital manager and ancillary staff. The medical staff deal with day-to-day medical matters, handle emergency cases, and undertake minor surgery. More complex and serious cases are transported to Cape Town for treatment, as are all expectant mothers for their deliveries.

There are instances of health problems attributed to endogamy, including glaucoma. In addition, there is a very high (42%) incidence of asthma among the population and research by Noe Zamel of the University of Toronto has led to discoveries about the genetic nature of the disease. Three of the original settlers of the island had asthma.

Culture

Music and traditional dance 
Tristan residents Mary Swain and Percy Lavarello were recorded in 1962 whilst evacuated in Calshot, Hampshire by Maud Karpeles and Peter Kennedy singing traditional songs and discussing the culture of the island, mainly music and dance; the full recording (split between seven tapes and also including other Tristan residents) can be heard on the British Library Sound Archive website. On these tapes, Mary Swain sings traditional English folk songs learnt from her mother, including seventeenth-century Child Ballads such as "Barbara Allen" and "The Golden Vanity". She also describes how dance was an important element of life on Tristan; well-known dances such as step dances, waltzes, polkas, mazurkas and schottisches were common, as well as many unique traditional dances such as "The Donkey Dance", "The Pillow Dance", "The Chair Dance" and something called "Tabby Oaker's Big Toe" which involved displaying one's feet. It seems that the music and dance of Tristan was ultimately derived from English traditions, but various peculiarities had developed.

Crime
No one has ever been arrested for crime by the single policeman on the island.

Radio and television
Local television began in 1984 using taped programming on Tuesday, Thursday and Sunday evenings. Live television did not arrive on the island until 2001, with the introduction of the British Forces Broadcasting Service (BFBS TV), which now provides six  channels: BBC One, BBC Two, ITV, Channel 4, Sky News and BFBS Extra, relayed to islanders via local transmitters. Recently the service was upgraded to digital, most TV screens are modern and DTV while some older analogue CRT equipments still are in use with digital boxes connected and there is at least one TV set per house. BFBS Radio 2 is the locally available radio station.

Newspapers 
The Tristan Times was an online newspaper for the island published from 2003 to 2019. The island government also posts news announcements on its website, which is maintained by the UK-based Tristan da Cunha Association.

Holidays and holiday traditions
The island holds an annual break from government and factory work which begins before Christmas and lasts for three weeks. The beginning of the holiday, called Break-Up Day, is usually marked with parties and celebrations. The islanders would traditionally have parties on Boxing Day but not on Christmas Day. 

Traditionally, on "Old Year's Day/Night" (meaning "New Year's Eve"), the islanders would conceal their identities with masks or blackface and the men would wear women's clothing; everyone would celebrate anonymously moving between households, singing songs, dancing, shouting, playing instruments and firing guns. At the stroke of midnight, a bell would announce the new year. On New Year's Day, the islanders would play cricket and football, and once again party later in the day. The disguises sometimes recall English Border Morris dancers. Similarly, in England in the Middle Ages, this period was one of continuous feasting and merrymaking, which climaxed on Twelfth Night, the traditional end of the Christmas season on 6 January. In Tudor England, Twelfth Night itself was forever solidified in popular culture when William Shakespeare used it as the setting for one of his most famous stage plays, titled Twelfth Night. Often a Lord of Misrule was chosen to lead the Christmas revels.

Sport 
Football, cricket and baseball were all historically played on the island.

It has been reported that football was introduced to the locals in the 1920s by Rev. Henry Rogers, and it remains the island’s favourite sport. Rose, Henry’s wife, wrote about informal kick-abouts continuing for years, and these fast became a part of Tristanian culture. The islanders would split themselves into two teams and play friendly matches, especially on dates of special occasions, such as weddings, christenings etc. 

In 1940 Tristan da Cunha's footballers played their first "international" game against the crew of a Norwegian ship. No record remains of the score. In the ensuing years, the game flourished, with the islanders playing matches against crews from vessels of various nationalities, including ships from the Royal Navy.

With live transmissions of televised football, the sport regained its former popularity. Tristan da Cunha FC was formed in 2002. A local fishing company bought them a kit (white shirts and blue shorts). They had a very basic pitch on American Field, named in recognition of the American forces stationed there during World War II. However, opponents were in short supply. It was a case of waiting for visiting opponents, and sometimes years might go by without any opportunities to play foreign opposition. Their first match was against a South African fishing vessel and they lost 10–6. The remoteness of Tristan da Cunha makes it virtually impossible for the team to travel abroad to play against foreign opposition. In recent times, the club's numbers have dropped to a level where only 5-a-side matches are being played.

Notable people 
 Edwin Heron Dodgson (1846–1918), a clergyman in the Church of England, was the youngest brother of Charles Lutwidge Dodgson (Lewis Carroll), author of Alice's Adventures in Wonderland. He is primarily remembered for his work as a missionary in the island of Tristan da Cunha from 1880 to 1884.
 Conrad Jack Glass  (born 1961) is a Tristanian police officer and a former Chief Islander. He is the first islander to have written a book about it, Rockhopper Copper (2005).
 William Glass (1786–1853), Scottish Corporal and founder of the island's settlement.
Anne Green (born 1952), first female Chief Islander and teacher.

In popular culture

Film

 In Wim Wenders's Wings of Desire, a dying man recollecting the things that have apparently meant most to him mentions "Tristan da Cunha".
 37°4 S is a short film about two teenagers who live on the island.

Literature

 Edgar Allan Poe's The Narrative of Arthur Gordon Pym of Nantucket (1838), Chapter 15, has a detailed history and description of the island.
 In Jules Verne's novel In Search of the Castaways, one of the chapters is set on Tristan da Cunha, and a brief history of the island is mentioned.
 Zinnie Harris's play, Further Than the Furthest Thing (2000), is inspired by events on the island, notably the 1961 volcanic eruption and evacuation of the islanders.
 Alice Munro's short story Deep-Holes in her 2009 short story collection Too Much Happiness. The female protagonist, a mother, confides to her young son about her fascination with remote islands like Tristan da Cunha and the Faroe Islands. Later, when her son goes missing, she fantasises that he has found his way to one of these islands and is living there.

Non-fiction
 Frank T. Bullen provides details of visiting the island in the 1870s in his book The Cruise of the Cachalot, first published in 1898.
 Francis Pease’s book To the Ends of the Earth (Hurst and Blackett Ltd., 1935) describes the RRS Discovery’s trip to Antartica in 1925, which stopped at Tristan da Cunha. Chapter 2 is titled  Folk of Tristan.
 Simon Winchester's book Outposts: Journeys to the Surviving Relics of the British Empire (1985, reprinted in 2003), devotes a chapter to the island, which he visited in the mid-1980s. In the foreword to the reprint, the author states that he was banned from Tristan da Cunha because of his writing about the war-time romance of a local woman. He published a longer account of his banishment in Lapham's Quarterly.
 In 2005, Rockhopper Copper, the first book about the island written by an Islander, was published. It was written by Conrad Glass, Tristan da Cunha's longtime policeman and conservation officer.

See also
 Outline of Tristan da Cunha
 Sandy Point, Tristan da Cunha

Notes

References

Further reading
 Guides
 A Short Guide to Tristan da Cunha by James Glass and Anne Green, Tristan Chief Islanders (2005, Whitby Press, 12 pages).
 Field Guides to the Animals and Plants of Tristan da Cunha and Gough Island Edited by Peter Ryan (2007, RSPB Publication, 168 pages).
 Gough Island: A Natural History by Christine Hanel, Steven Chown and Kevin Gaston (2005, Sun Press, 169 pages).
 
 Culture
 Tristan da Cunha: History, People, Language by Daniel Schreier and Karen Lavarello-Schreier (2003, Battlebridge, 88 pages).
 Rockhopper Copper: The life and times of the people of the most remote inhabited island on Earth by Conrad Glass MBE, Tristan Police Officer (2005, Polperro Heritage Press, 176 pages).
 Recipes from Tristan da Cunha by Dawn Repetto, Tristan Tourism Co-ordinator (2010, Tristan Books, 32 pages).
 Corporal Glass's Island: The Story of Tristan da Cunha by Nancy Hosegood (1966, Farrar, Straus, Giroux, 192 pages, with several pages of photographs).
 Three Years in Tristan da Cunha by Katherine Mary Barrow (1910, Skeffington & Son, 200 pages, with 37 photographs).

External links

 Forum about the island's spoken English

News and government
 Tristan da Cunha – news from the Tristan da Cunha Government and the Tristan da Cunha Association
 Tristan Times – former newspaper

History of the island
 
 History of Tristan da Cunha (2 books, and other material)
 TRISTAN DA CUNHA (Spanish)
 LIFE Magazine article about 1961 evacuation.

Videos of the island
 Return to Trista da Cunha, Global Nomad, National Geographic (2012).
 A Day on Tristan da Cunha, Global Nomad, National Geographic (2011).
 Tristan da Cunha: The story of Asthma Island, part 1 and part 2, BBC Four (2008).
 Tristan da Cunha: Life on the island in 1963 (1963).
 Tristan da Cunha: Life of an islander in 1963 (1963).

 
 
 
English-speaking countries and territories
Important Bird Areas of Saint Helena
Seabird colonies
States and territories established in 1816
States and territories established in 1938
Former British colonies and protectorates in Africa
Mid-Atlantic Ridge
Penguin colonies